Aeropostal Alas de Centroamerica was a low-cost airline based in San José, Costa Rica. Its main base was Juan Santamaría International Airport, San José.

History
The airline was established in 2003 in San José by Aeropostal Alas de Venezuela. It started operations in 2005. It ceased operations in 2007.

Fleet
Aeropostal Alas de Centroamerica consisted of the following aircraft (at March 2007):

1 McDonnell Douglas DC-9-20 (TI-AZS)

References

External links
Aeropostal

Defunct airlines of Costa Rica
Airlines established in 2003
Airlines disestablished in 2007